Jernej is a Slovenian form of the name Bartholomew. The short form is Nejc.

Persons with this name

Jernej Damjan (born 1983), Slovenian ski-jumper
Jernej Koblar (born 1971), Slovenian alpine skier
Jernej Kopitar (1780–1844), Slovenian linguist and philologist

Fictional characters with this name

Hlapec Jernej, the main character in a novel by Ivan Cankar

External links
Name statistics and popularity

Slovene masculine given names